Johnny Watson Navarro (1963 – 8 December 1987) was a Peruvian professional footballer who played for Sport Boys and Alianza Lima.

Watson died in the 1987 Alianza Lima air disaster.

References

External links
 Alianza Lima official website

1963 births
1987 deaths
People from Lima Region
Association football forwards
Peruvian footballers
Sport Boys footballers
Club Alianza Lima footballers
Victims of aviation accidents or incidents in Peru
Footballers killed in the 1987 Alianza Lima plane crash